A Splendid Hazard is a 1920 American silent drama film directed by Allan Dwan and starring Henry B. Walthall. The film is based on the 1910 book of the same name. The film was produced by the Mayflower Photoplay Company. It is not known whether the film currently survives; this suggests that it may be a lost film.

Plot
The main character, Karl Breitman (Henry B. Walthall) thinks he is a descendant of Napoleon and tries bring back to France the French monarchy. As part of his plot he courts Hedda Gobert (Rosemary Theby) as she owns some Napoleon's papers. After winning Hedda heart he takes the documents from her. He travels to America to visit Admiral Killigrew (Hardee Kirkland). He hopes the stolen papers will lead him to Napoleon wealth. He finds a treasure map in the Admiral's home and then travels to Corsica. Before finding the Napoleon wealth, he comes across someone that mocks him. He challenges them to a duel. In the duel he is mortally wounded. He dies at his love side, Hedda.

Cast
Henry B. Walthall as  Karl Breitman
Rosemary Theby as Hedda Gobert
Norman Kerry as John Fitzgerald
Ann Forrest as Laura Killigrew
Hardee Kirkland as Adm. Killegrew
Thomas Jefferson as Dr. Ferraud
Philo McCullough as Arthur Cathewe
J. Jiquel Lanoe as Jiquel Lanoe
Joseph J. Dowling as Joseph Dowling

References

External links

1920 films
1920 drama films
Silent American drama films
American silent feature films
American black-and-white films
Films directed by Allan Dwan
First National Pictures films
Treasure hunt films
Films based on American novels
1920s American films
Silent adventure films